Ärtemarks IF is a sports club in Ärtemark, Sweden. The club's table tennis section won the Swedish women's national championships during the seasons of 2005–2006 and 2006–2007. The men's team qualified for the 2007–2008 Elitserien and even played som home games in the People's Republic of China. In 2014, the club's table tennis activity was transferred  over to Dals BTK.

References

External links
 Ärtemarks IF 

Football clubs in Västra Götaland County
Table tennis clubs in Sweden